Gloria Stuart was an American film actress whose career spanned over 70 years. She made her feature film debut in Street of Women (1932), before signing a contract with Universal Pictures. She appeared in numerous Pre-code era films for the studio, including the horror comedy The Old Dark House (1932), and the drama Laughter in Hell (1933). She starred as Flora Cranley in  The Invisible Man (1933), which garnered her widespread fame, and later starred in two films opposite Shirley Temple: Poor Little Rich Girl (1936), and Rebecca of Sunnybrook Farm (1938), both for 20th Century Fox. She subsequently co-starred in The Three Musketeers (1939) opposite Don Ameche.

Dissatisfied with her career in film, Stuart shifted her focus to stage acting. Between 1940 and 1942, Stuart appeared in numerous summer stock plays in New England, including a 1940 production of Our Town in which she starred alongside its playwright and director, Thornton Wilder. By the mid-1940s, Stuart was dedicating her time to the pursuit of various visual arts, including painting, printmaking, serigraphy, Bonsai, and découpage. She gradually returned to acting in the 1970s after a decades-long career as an artist, appearing in minor roles in such films as Richard Benjamin's My Favorite Year (1982) and Wildcats (1986). 

Stuart was cast as 101-year-old Rose Calvert in James Cameron's drama Titanic (1997), which earned her international notoriety, as well as numerous accolades, including an Academy Award nomination for Best Supporting Actress; which as of 2021, she remains the oldest nominee for the category. Her final film performance was a minor part in Wim Wenders' Land of Plenty (2004), before her death in 2010 at age 100.

Film
Note: Some sources include Back Street (1932) in Stuart's filmography in an uncredited performance; since Stuart does not mention the film in her book, and because she is not listed in Back Street, this film is not included below.

Television

Stage

References

Sources

Actress filmographies
American filmographies